McCuistion Glacier is a tributary glacier,  long, which flows west along the north side of Lubbock Ridge to enter Shackleton Glacier, in the Queen Maud Mountains of Antarctica. It was named by the Advisory Committee on Antarctic Names for Construction Driver Joshua P. McCuistion, U.S. Navy, who was injured in an Otter airplane crash on December 22, 1955, following take-off from the Cape Bird area.

References

Glaciers of Dufek Coast